Rotunno is a surname. Notable people with the surname include:

Giuseppe Rotunno (1923–2021), Italian cinematographer
Ernesto Rotunno, Uruguayan chess master
Nicola Rotunno (1928–1999), Italian Roman Catholic prelate
Joanne Rotunno (1931-1984), American actress